Luca Gentili may refer to:

 Luca Gentili (footballer, born 1972), former Italian footballer and goalkeeping coach
 Luca Gentili (footballer, born 1986), Italian footballer